The bearded vulture (Gypaetus barbatus), also known as the lammergeier and ossifrage, is a very large bird of prey and the only member of the genus Gypaetus. Traditionally considered an Old World vulture, it actually forms a separate minor lineage of Accipitridae together with the Egyptian vulture (Neophron percnopterus), its closest living relative. It is not much more closely related to the Old World vultures proper than to, for example, hawks, and differs from the former by its feathered neck. Although dissimilar, the Egyptian and bearded vulture each have a lozenge-shaped tail—unusual among birds of prey.
It is vernacularly known as Homa, a divine bird in Iranian mythology.

The bearded vulture population is thought to be in decline; in 2004, it was classified on the IUCN Red List as least concern but has been listed as near threatened since 2014. It lives and breeds on crags in high mountains in southern Europe, East Africa, the Indian subcontinent, Tibet, and the Caucasus. Females lay one or two eggs in mid-winter that hatch at the beginning of spring. The bearded vulture is the only known vertebrate whose diet consists of 70–90% bone.

Taxonomy
Vultur barbatus was the scientific name used by Carl Linnaeus in the 10th edition of Systema Naturae (1758).

Description

It weighs , with the nominate race averaging  and G. b. meridionalis of Africa averaging . In Eurasia, vultures found around the Himalayas tend to be slightly larger than those from other mountain ranges. Females are slightly larger than males. The tail is longer than the width of the wing. The proportions of the species have been compared to a falcon, scaled to an enormous size.

Unlike most vultures, the bearded vulture does not have a bald head. This species is relatively small-headed, although its neck is powerful and thick. It has a generally elongated, slender shape, sometimes appearing bulkier due to the often hunched back of these birds. The gait on the ground is waddling and the feet are large and powerful. The adult is mostly dark gray, rusty, and whitish in color. It is grey-blue to grey-black above. The creamy-coloured forehead contrasts against a black band across the eyes and lores and bristles under the chin, which form a black beard that give the species its English name. Bearded vultures are variably orange or rust of plumage on their head, breast, and leg feathers, but this is actually cosmetic. This colouration may come from dust-bathing, rubbing mud on its body, or drinking mineral-rich waters. The tail feathers and wings are gray. The juvenile bird is dark black-brown over most of the body, with a buff-brown breast and takes five years to reach full maturity. The bearded vulture is silent, apart from shrill whistles in their breeding displays and a falcon-like cheek-acheek call made around the nest.

Physiology
The acid concentration in the bearded vulture's stomach has been estimated to be of pH about 1. Large bones will be digested in about 24 hours, aided by slow mixing or churning of the stomach content. The high fat content of bone marrow makes the net energy value of bone almost as good as that of muscle, even if bone is less completely digested. A skeleton left on a mountain will dehydrate and become protected from bacterial degradation, and the bearded vulture can return to consume the remainder of a carcass even months after the soft parts have been consumed by other animals, larvae, and bacteria.

Distribution and habitat
The bearded vulture is sparsely distributed across a vast range. It occurs in mountainous regions in the Pyrenees, the Alps, the Arabian Peninsula, the Caucasus region, the Zagros Mountains, the Alborz, the Koh-i-Baba in Bamyan, Afghanistan, the Altai Mountains, the Himalayas, Ladakh in northern India, and western and central China. In Africa, it lives in the Atlas Mountains, the Ethiopian Highlands and south from Sudan to northeastern Democratic Republic of the Congo, central Kenya, and northern Tanzania. An isolated population inhabits the Drakensberg in South Africa. In Israel it is locally extinct as a breeder since 1981, but young birds have been reported in 2000, 2004, and 2016. The species is extinct in Romania, the last specimens from the Carpathians being shot in 1927. However, unconfirmed sightings of the bearded vulture happened in the 2000s, and in 2016 a specimen from a restoration project in France also flew over the country before returning to the Alps.

This species is almost entirely associated with mountains and monadnocks with plentiful cliffs, crags, precipices, canyons, and gorges. They are often found near alpine pastures and meadows, montane grassland and heath, steep-sided, rocky wadis, high steppe, and are occasional around forests. They seem to prefer desolate, lightly-populated areas where predators that provide many bones, such as wolves and golden eagles, have healthy populations.

In Ethiopia, it is now common at garbage dumps tips on the outskirts of small villages and towns. In southern Armenia they have been found to breed below  if cliff availability permits.

During the 1970s and 1980s the population of the bearded vulture in southern Africa declined. However, their distribution remained constant. The bearded vulture population occupies the highlands of Lesotho, Free State, Eastern Cape, Maloti Mountains, and Drakensberg mountains in KwaZulu-Natal. Adult bearded vultures utilise areas with higher altitudes, with steep slopes and sharp points and within areas that are situated closer to their nesting sites. Adult bearded vultures are more likely to fly below  over Lesotho. Along the Drakensberg Escarpment from the area of Golden Gate Highlands National Park south into the northern part of the Eastern Cape there was the greatest densities of bearded vultures.

Abundance of the bearded vulture is shown for eight regions within the species' range in southern Africa, where the total population is estimated as being 408 adult birds and 224 young birds of all age classes therefore giving an estimate of about 632 birds.

Though a rare visitor, bearded vultures occasionally travel to parts of the United Kingdom, with the first confirmed sighting taking place in 2016 in Wales and the Westcountry. A series of sightings took place in 2020, when an individual bird was sighted separately over the Channel Island of Alderney after migrating north through France, then in the Peak District, Derbyshire, Cambridgeshire, and Lincolnshire. The bird, nicknamed 'Vigo' by Tim Birch of the Derbyshire Wildlife Trust, is believed to have originated from the reintroduced population in the Alps.

Behaviour and ecology

Diet and feeding

Like other vultures, it is a scavenger, feeding mostly on the remains of dead animals. The bearded vulture diet comprises mammals (93%), birds (6%) and reptiles (1%), with medium-sized ungulates forming a large part of the diet. It usually disdains the actual meat and lives on a diet that is typically 85–90% bones. While the bone marrow contains fat and energy, they consume all of it. This is the only living bird species that specializes in feeding on bones. Meat and skin only makes up a small part of what the adults eat, but scraps of meat or skin makes up a larger amount of the chicks' diet. The bearded vulture can swallow whole or bite through brittle bones up to the size of a lamb's femur and its powerful digestive system quickly dissolves even large pieces.

After dropping the large bones, the bearded vulture spirals or glides down to inspect them and may repeat the act if the bone is not sufficiently cracked. This learned skill requires extensive practice by immature birds and takes up to seven years to master. Its old name of ossifrage ("bone breaker") relates to this habit. Less frequently, these birds have been observed trying to break bones (usually of a medium size) by hammering them with their bill directly into rocks while perched. During the breeding season they feed mainly on carrion. They prefer the limbs of sheep and other small mammals and they carry the food to the nest, unlike other vultures which feed their young by regurgitation.

Bearded vultures sometimes attack live prey, with perhaps greater regularity than any other vulture. Among these, tortoises seem to be especially favored depending on their local abundance. Tortoises preyed on may be nearly as heavy as the preying vulture. To kill tortoises, bearded vultures fly with them to some height and drop them to crack open the bulky reptiles' hard shells. Golden eagles have been observed to kill tortoises in the same way. Other live animals, up to nearly their own size, have been observed to be predaceously seized and dropped in flight. Larger animals have been known to be attacked by bearded vultures, including ibex, Capra goats, chamois, and steenbok. These animals have been killed by being surprised by the large birds and battered with wings until they fall off precipitous rocky edges to their deaths; although in some cases these may be accidental killings when both the vulture and the mammal surprise each other. Many large animals killed by bearded vultures are unsteady young, or have appeared sickly or obviously injured. Humans have been anecdotally reported to have been killed in the same way. This is unconfirmed, however, and if it does happen, most biologists who have studied the birds generally agree it would be accidental on the part of the vulture. Occasionally smaller ground-dwelling birds, such as partridges and pigeons, have been reported eaten, possibly either as fresh carrion (which is usually ignored by these birds) or killed with beating wings by the vulture. Occasionally, breeding pairs may forage and hunt together. In the Ethiopian Highlands, bearded vultures have adapted to living largely off human refuse.

Reproduction and life cycle

The bearded vulture occupies an enormous territory year-round. It may forage over  each day. The breeding period is variable, being December through September in Eurasia, November to June in the Indian subcontinent, October to May in Ethiopia, throughout the year in eastern Africa, and May to January in southern Africa. Although generally solitary, the bond between a breeding pair is often considerably close. Biparental monogamous care occurs in the bearded vulture. In a few cases, polyandry has been recorded in the species. The territorial and breeding display between bearded vultures is often spectacular, involving the showing of talons, tumbling, and spiraling while in solo flight. The large birds also regularly lock feet with each other and fall some distance through the sky with each other. In Europe the breeding pairs of bearded vultures are estimated to be 120. The mean productivity of the bearded vulture is 0.43±0.28 fledgings per breeding pair per year and the breeding success averaged 0.56±0.30 fledgings per pair with clutches/year.

The female usually lays a clutch of 1 to 2 eggs, though 3 have been recorded on rare occasions, which are incubated for 53 to 60 days. After hatching, the young spend 100 to 130 days in the nest before fledging. The young may be dependent on the parents for up to 2 years, forcing the parents to nest in alternate years on a regular basis. Typically, the bearded vulture nests in caves and on ledges and rock outcrops or caves on steep rock walls, so are very difficult for nest-predating mammals to access. Wild bearded vultures have a mean lifespan of 21.4 years, but have lived for up to at least 45 years in captivity.

Threats

The bearded vulture is one of the most endangered European bird species as over the last century its abundance and breeding range have drastically declined. It naturally occurs at low densities, with anywhere from a dozen to 500 pairs now being found in each mountain range in Eurasia where the species breeds. The species is most common in Ethiopia, where an estimated 1,400 to 2,200 are believed to breed. Relatively large, healthy numbers seem to occur in some parts of the Himalayas as well. It was largely wiped out in Europe and, by the beginning of the 20th century, the only substantial population was in the Spanish and French Pyrenees. Since then, it has been successfully reintroduced to the Swiss and Italian Alps, from where they have spread into France. They have also declined somewhat in parts of Asia and Africa, though less severely than in Europe.

Many raptor species were shielded from anthropogenic influences in previously underdeveloped areas therefore they are greatly impacted as the human population rises and infrastructure increases in underdeveloped areas. The increase in human population and infrastructure results in the declines of the bearded vulture populations today. The increase of infrastructure includes the building of houses, roads, and power lines. A major issue with infrastructure and bird species populations is collision with power lines. The declines of the bearded vulture populations have been documented throughout their range resulting from a decrease in habitat space, fatal collisions with energy infrastructure, reduced food availability, poisons left out for carnivores and direct persecution in the form of Trophy Hunting.

This species is currently listed as near threatened by the IUCN Red List last accessed on 1 October 2016, the population continues to decline as the distribution ranges of this species continues to decline due to human development.

Conservation
Mitigation plans have been established to reduce the population declines in bearded vulture populations. One of these plans includes the South African Biodiversity Management Plan that has been ratified by the government to stop the population decline in the short term. Actions that have been implemented include the mitigation of existing and proposed energy structures to prevent collision risks, the improved management of supplementary feeding sites as well to reduce the populations from being exposed to human persecution and poisoning accidents and outreach programmes that are aimed at reducing poisoning incidents.

The Foundation for the Conservation of the Bearded Vulture, established in Spain in 1995, was created in response to the national population dropping to 30 specimens by the end of the 20th century. Focused on conserving the species in the Pyrenees, it also returned the species to other already extinct areas such as the Picos de Europa in the north of the country or the Sierra de Cazorla, in the south. After 25 years of work, the Foundation reported that they had managed to recover the species, with more than 1,000 specimens throughout the country.

Reintroduction in the Alps
Efforts to reintroduce the bearded vulture began in the 1970s in the French Alps. Zoologists Paul Geroudet and Gilbert Amigues attempted to release vultures that had been captured in Afghanistan, but this approach proved unsuccessful: it was too difficult to capture the vultures in the first place, and too many died in transport on their way to France. A second attempt was made in 1987, using a technique called "hacking", in which young individuals (from 90 to 100 days) from zoological parks would be taken from the nest and placed in a protected area in the Alps. As they were still unable to fly at that age, the chicks were hand-fed by humans until the birds learned to fly and were able to reach food without human assistance. This method has proven more successful, with over 200 birds released in the Alps from 1987 to 2015, and a bearded vulture population has reestablished itself in the Alps.

Etymology
The name lammergeier originates from the German word , which means "lamb-vulture". The name stems from the belief that it attacked lambs of domestic sheep. Its old name of ossifrage ("bone breaker"), which originates from Middle French and from Latin ossifraga (“osprey”), relates to its actual feeding mode.

In culture

The bearded vulture is considered a threatened species in Iran. Iranian mythology considers the rare bearded vulture (Persian: هما, 'Homa') the symbol of luck and happiness. It was believed that if the shadow of a Homa fell on one, he would rise to sovereignty and anyone shooting the bird would die in forty days. The habit of eating bones and apparently not killing living animals was noted by Sa'di in Gulistan, written in 1258, and Emperor Jahangir had a bird's crop examined in 1625 to find that it was filled with bones.

The ancient Greeks used ornithomancers to guide their political decisions: bearded vultures, or ossifrage, were one of the few species of birds that could yield valid signs to these soothsayers.

The Greek playwright Aeschylus was said to have been killed in 456 or 455 BC by a tortoise dropped by an eagle who mistook his bald head for a stone—if this incident did occur, the bearded vulture is a likely candidate for the "eagle" in this story.

In the Bible/Torah, the bearded vulture, as the ossifrage, is among the birds forbidden to be eaten (Leviticus 11:13).

In 1944, Shimon Peres and David Ben-Gurion found a nest of bearded vultures in the Negev desert. The bird is called  in Hebrew, and Shimon Persky liked it so much he adopted it as his surname.

References

External links

 Video of bearded vulture shattering bones into smaller pieces on which it then feeds at ARKive
 Species text in The Atlas of Southern African Birds
 Facts and Characteristics: Bearded Vulture at Vulture Territory 
 The bearded vulture in Spain
 Cine and photo work about the Bearded Vulture in the Alps
 diet information
 Bearded Vulture & The Snow Wolf: A Winter's Tale, BBC

Birds of Europe
Birds of prey of Africa
Birds of Tibet
Birds of Western Asia
bearded vulture
Taxa named by Carl Linnaeus
bearded vulture